David Elliott Graham (born February 1, 1939) is a former professional American football player who played offensive tackle for six seasons for the Philadelphia Eagles. After his six seasons, he became a high school principal in Markham, Fauquier County, Virginia.

References

1939 births
Living people
American football offensive tackles
Philadelphia Eagles players
Virginia Cavaliers football players
Sportspeople from Bridgeport, Connecticut
Players of American football from Connecticut